Ramhet Bharti is an Indian politician and a member of the 16th Legislative Assembly in India. He represents the Hargaon constituency of Uttar Pradesh and is a member of the Bahujan Samaj Party political party.

Early life and  education
Ramhet Bharti was born in Sitapur district. He attended the Shia P.G. College and attained Bachelor of Laws degree. Bharti belongs to the scheduled caste category.

Political career
Ramhet Bharti has been a MLA for three terms. He represented the Hargaon constituency and is a member of the Bahujan Samaj Party political party.

He lost his seat in the 2017 Uttar Pradesh Assembly election to Suresh Rahi of the Bharatiya Janata Party.

Posts held

See also

 Hargaon (Assembly constituency)
 Sixteenth Legislative Assembly of Uttar Pradesh
 Uttar Pradesh Legislative Assembly

References 

1955 births
Bahujan Samaj Party politicians from Uttar Pradesh
Living people
People from Sitapur district
Uttar Pradesh MLAs 2002–2007
Uttar Pradesh MLAs 2007–2012
Uttar Pradesh MLAs 2012–2017
Uttar Pradesh politicians